Yunis Aliyev (born 9 October 1958 in Kyzylgadzhyly, Goranboy District, Azerbaijan SSR – 5 May 1992, Talysh) was the military serviceman of Azerbaijan Armed Forces, Chief Colonel and warrior during the Nagorno-Karabakh conflict.

Early life and education 
In 1973, Aliyev studied at Dash Kyzylgadzhyly village secondary school and then continued his secondary education at School No. 102 in Dalimammadli. In 1976, he was drafted to the Soviet Armed Forces and assigned to Tajikistan.

Personal life 
Aliyev was married and had two children.

Nagorno Karabakh War 
In 1992, Aliyev joined the second battalion established in Goranboy District. His first fight against Armenian army was in Aghdara. On 4 May 1992, he prepared a plan called "Yaltahil" to prevent the attacks of Armenians in the Talysh settlement of the Tapqaraqoyunlu village of the Goranboy District. That operation was successful for Azerbaijani soldiers. One day later, Armenian soldiers suddenly attacked the positions of Azerbaijani army. Aliyev was killed during that fight and his body was found only 43 days after the Talish village was released.

Honors 
Yunis Asker oglu Aliyev was posthumously awarded the title of the "National Hero of Azerbaijan" by Presidential Decree No. 833 dated 7 June 1992.

He was buried at a cemetery in 1992 in Kyzylgadzhyly village of Goranboy District. Kyzylgadzhyly village kindergarten No. 3 was named after him.

See also 
 First Nagorno-Karabakh War
 List of National Heroes of Azerbaijan

References

Sources 
Vugar Asgarov. Azərbaycanın Milli Qəhrəmanları (Yenidən işlənmiş II nəşr). Bakı: "Dərələyəz-M", 2010, səh. 91.

1958 births
1992 deaths
Azerbaijani military personnel
Azerbaijani military personnel of the Nagorno-Karabakh War
Azerbaijani military personnel killed in action
National Heroes of Azerbaijan
People from Goranboy District